Prunus pygeoides, ( "Yunnan cherry laurel"), is a species of Prunus native to India and China, preferring to grow at 900–1500m. It is typically a tree reaching 6-10m tall. It is rare in India.

References

pygeoides
Flora of China
Flora of India (region)
Plants described in 1878